Sir Henry Curwen (c. 1581 – 23 October 1623) was an English politician who sat in the House of Commons from 1621 to 1622.

Curwen was the only son of Sir Nicholas Curwen of Workington, Cumberland and his first wife Ann Musgrave. He matriculated at Pembroke College, Cambridge in about 1595. He succeeded his father in 1605, by which time he had been knighted.

Biography
He served as a Justice of the Peace for Cumberland from 1617 until his death and was appointed High Sheriff of Cumberland for 1619–20. In 1621, he was elected Member of Parliament for Cumberland. 

Curwen died in 1624. He is buried in Amersham with a memorial sculpted by Edward Marshall.

He had married firstly Catherine Dalston, daughter of Sir John Dalston of Dalston, Cumberland, and secondly Margaret Bruskill, daughter of Thomas Bruskill, counsellor of Heversham, Westmorland. His son Patricius was later MP for Cumberland.

References

 

1580s births
1623 deaths
English MPs 1621–1622
Alumni of Pembroke College, Cambridge
High Sheriffs of Cumberland
Henry